This is an article about the postage stamps and postal history of the Sovereign Military Order of Malta.

The Sovereign Military Hospitaller Order of Saint John of Jerusalem, of Rhodes, and of Malta, otherwise known as the Sovereign Military Order of Malta or SMOM is a Roman Catholic order based in Rome, Italy. The order takes its origins from the Knights Hospitaller, an organization founded in Jerusalem in 1050. Following the loss of Christian held territories of the Holy Land to Muslims, the Order operated from Rhodes (1310–1523), and later from Malta (1530–1798), over which it was sovereign.

Postal service in Hospitaller Malta 

In 1708, a formal postal service known as the Commissary of Posts was established by Grand Master Ramon Perellós, and it was based at the Casa del Commun Tesoro in Valletta. The first postal markings on Maltese mail appeared later on in the 18th century, and the postal service continued to function until the expulsion of the Hospitallers by Napoleon in 1798. Malta's postal service was subsequently reformed during French and later British rule, and part of the Casa del Commun Tesoro remained a post office until 1849.

Stamps 

In 1950, the SMOM issued a set of cinderella letter seals depicting locations and people associated with the Order, and they were sold for 1 Italian lira.

The Order's modern postal administration, known as the Poste Magistrali, was instituted on 20 May 1966 under a Decree of the Grand Master, and post offices were established at Palazzo Malta and Villa del Priorato di Malta in Rome. Poste Magistrali issued its first set of stamps on 15 November 1966, and these and subsequent issues were denominated in Scudi, Grani and Tarì, which roughly equated to the currency of Malta before it joined the Eurozone; 1 scudo = 12 tari = 240 grani = 12 Maltese cents. Since 1 January 2005 the stamps have been denominated in euros.

The stamps are inscribed Poste Magistrali and bear one or more small Maltese Crosses. Early issues were printed by De La Rue, but today a variety of Maltese and Italian printers are used. As well as postage stamps, the Order has produced aerogrammes, maximum cards, first day covers, miniature sheets, postage due stamps and postcards with imprinted stamps.

Each year, one stamp issue is devoted to St. John the Baptist, who is the Order's Patron Saint, and one to the celebration of Christmas.

Status 

The stamps are issued for both postal and charitable reasons. Despite over 50 bi-lateral postal agreements the stamps are usually classed as cinderella stamps as they do not have postal validity throughout the world. Most postal agreements are with countries in which the order does charitable work.

The SMOM is not a member of the Universal Postal Union.

References

External links
Magistral Post of the Sovereign Military Order of Malta - Official philatelic website

History of the Sovereign Military Order of Malta
Postal system of Italy
Cinderella stamps
Philately of Italy